The Prague City Assembly is the elected legislative body of Prague, the capital city of the Czech Republic. The capital city of Prague is a separate type of territorial self-governing entity and is therefore neither a region nor a municipality. The assembly has similar powers to those of Czech regional and municipal councils. It is composed of 55 to 70 members who are elected as part of the municipal council elections for 4 years.

The assembly meets in the New City Hall municipal building on Mariánské náměstí. It usually meets once a month, with the exception of the months of July and August, or as needed. Assembly meetings are, unlike Prague City Council meetings, publicly accessible and are available live and recorded on the website of the City Hall of Prague.

See also
 Prague City Hall

References

Politics of Prague